Scott K. Evans (born September 8, 1965) is an American Democratic politician and the former Mayor of Atlantic City, New Jersey. Evans is Fire Chief with the Atlantic City Fire Department.

Biography
He was born on September 8, 1965 in Atlantic City, New Jersey.

He was the chairman of the Atlantic City Democratic Committee when former Mayor Bob Levy resigned in October 2007. Following state law, the party Evans chaired nominated Evans and two other people to serve as mayor until the next general election. City Council then picked Evans from the three candidates.
Evans lost the city Democratic party mayoral nomination on June 3, 2008 to Lorenzo Langford and the city Democratic party chairmanship on June 9, 2008 to Robert "Bob" McDevitt. He left the mayor's office Dec. 31, 2008.

References

1965 births
Mayors of Atlantic City, New Jersey
New Jersey Democrats
Living people